Potty Mouth may refer to:
 Profanity
 Potty Mouth (Codename: Kids Next Door), toilet-headed villain from the animated television series Codename: Kids Next Door
 "Potty Mouth", episode 74 of The Loud House
Pottymouth, first studio album by the American punk rock band Bratmobile
Potty Mouth (band), a Los Angeles-based punk rock band.
Potty Mouth (EP), EP by the band Potty Mouth
Potty Mouth (song), by Tyga featuring Busta Rhymes